Kari Tapani Jalkanen (22 November 1945 – 7 December 2010), better known by his stage name Kari Tapio, was a Finnish schlager and country & western singer. During his career, he was one of the most popular singers in Finland for decades; having sold over 830,000 certified records (during his career and posthumously), he is the best-selling soloist in the country. Kari Tapio was born in Suonenjoki, Finland.  In the 1960s he performed in his home town Pieksämäki with the local bands ER-Quartet and Jami & The Noisemakers. In 1966 he took singing lessons from Ture Ara.

After Kari Tapio's first single "Tuuli kääntyköön"/"Niskavuoren nuorimmainen" in 1972, he performed in Ilkka "Danny" Lipsanen's show. In the beginning his role was to take care of the snake that was used in the show. Before music became a job for him, he worked as a typesetter in a printing house.

In 1976 Kari Tapio finally broke through with his single Laula kanssain (literally "Sing with Me", a Finnish cover of Jackpot's Sing My Love Song), which was followed by Viisitoista kesää ("Fifteen Summers," a cover of Living Next Door to Alice) and Kaipuu ("Longing", a cover of Mort Shuman's Sorrow). In later years Olen suomalainen ("I Am a Finn", a cover of Toto Cutugno's L'Italiano), Myrskyn jälkeen ("After the Storm"), En pyydä paljon ("I Don't Ask for Much", a cover of Paulina Rubio's Te Quise Tanto) and Paalupaikka ("Pole Position"), among others, were among his most popular songs. In 2003 the Iskelmä-Finlandia award was given to him.

Many of Kari Tapio's songs have influences from country music. He sang many Finnish versions of the songs of Johnny Cash, Waylon Jennings, and Kris Kristofferson.

Kari Tapio was one of the candidates to represent Finland in the Eurovision Song Contest 2008 with the song Valaise yö ("Light up the night"). In the finals, he placed second; and Teräsbetoni was chosen to represent Finland.

Kari Tapio died of a heart attack in the yard of his home in Haukilahti, Espoo, Finland on the 7th of December 2010.

Discography

Albums 
 Aikapommi (1974) (with Erkki Liikanen)
 Nostalgiaa (1976)
 Klabbi (1976)
 Kaipuu (1977)
 Kari Tapio (1979)
 Jää vierellein (1981)
 Olen suomalainen (1983)
 Ovi elämään (1984)
 Osa minusta (1986)
 Elämän viulut (1987)
 Tää kaipuu (1988)
 Aikaan täysikuun (1990)
 Yön tuuli vain (1992)
 Sinitaikaa (1993)
 Laulaja (1994)
 Myrskyn jälkeen (1995) #23
 Meren kuisketta (1997) #9
 Sinut tulen aina muistamaan (1998) #7
 Valoon päin (1999) #5
 Bella Capri (2000) #6
 Kari Tapio konserttilavalla (2001) #30
 Joulun tarina (2001)
 Juna kulkee (2003) #4
 Toiset on luotuja kulkemaan (2004) #5
 Paalupaikka (2005) #5
 Kuin taivaisiin (2007) #1
 Kaksi maailmaa (March 26, 2008)
 Viimeiseen pisaraan (March 25, 2009)
 Vieras paratiisissa (May 5, 2010)

Compilations 
 28 suosituinta levytystä (1987)
 Toivotut (1992)
 Viisitoista kesää (1995)
 20 suosikkia – Olen suomalainen (1995)
 20 suosikkia – Luoksesi Tukholmaan (1997)
 Parhaat (1997)
 Kaikki parhaat (1999) #2
 20 suosikkia – Kulkurin kyyneleet (2001)
 20 suosikkia – Sanoit liian paljon (2001)
 Kaikkien aikojen parhaat – 40 klassikkoa (2002) #17
 Nostalgia (2005)
 Lauluja rakkaudesta (2006) #13
 Laulaja 1945-2010 (2011) #1

See also
List of best-selling music artists in Finland

References

External links

MySpace
Facebook
Last.FM

1945 births
2010 deaths
People from Suonenjoki
20th-century Finnish male singers
21st-century Finnish male singers